Unedogemmula boreoturricula is an extinct species of sea snail, a marine gastropod mollusk in the family Turridae, the turrids.

Description
The length of the shell attains 28 mm.

Distribution
This extinct marine species was found in Miocene strata in Belgium and the Netherlands.

References

 Kautsky, Fritz. "Das Miozän von Hemmoor und Basbeck-Osten." (1925).

External links
 fossilshells.nl: Unedogemmula boreoturricula
  biblio.naturalsciences.be, Pleurotomes du Miocene de la Belgique et du Bassin de la Loire

boreoturricula
Gastropods described in 1925